The Illinois Shakespeare Festival (ISF) is held in Bloomington, Illinois, United States at Ewing Theatre and in Normal, Illinois, United States at the Center for Performing Arts Theatre at Illinois State University.  The Festival began in 1978 and celebrated its 45th season in 2023. The Festival has traditionally presented three plays. Although all three may be Shakespeare plays, the Festival has also included different types of theater, such as Restoration comedy, Commedia dell'arte, or works by contemporary playwrights.

The Festival is produced by the School of Theatre and Dance and the College of Fine Arts at Illinois State University.  Performances take place at Ewing Cultural Center on Ewing Theatre, a re-creation of the Globe Stage complete with open air amphitheater. The Festival markets itself as "theatre under the stars." Before many nightly performances, the Festival has presented free pre-show entertainment, including live jazz, abbreviated versions of the play to come, or other light or short performances. In 2008, The Festival began shows aimed towards younger audiences called Theatre for Young Audiences, which have traditionally been performed on Wednesday and Saturday mornings.

The Festival runs from the later part of June through the middle of August.

Production History
Unless otherwise noted, the plays are written by William Shakespeare.

1978
 As You Like It
 Macbeth
 Twelfth Night
1979
 Hamlet
 King Henry IV, Part 1
 The Taming of the Shrew
1980
 The Merry Wives of Windsor
 A Midsummer Night's Dream
 Romeo and Juliet
1981
 The Comedy of Errors
 Julius Caesar
 The Winter's Tale
1982
 King Henry IV, Part 2
 Love's Labour's Lost
 Othello
1983
 Macbeth
 Much Ado About Nothing
 The Two Gentlemen of Verona
1984
 Pericles
 The Merchant of Venice
 The Taming of the Shrew
1985
 Cymbeline
 King Lear
 A Midsummer Night's Dream
1986
 As You Like It
 Hamlet
 The Tempest
1987
 Measure for Measure
 Romeo and Juliet
 Twelfth Night
1988
 All's Well That Ends Well
 The Comedy of Errors
 Richard III
1989
 Henry V
 The Merry Wives of Windsor
 She Stoops to Conquer by Oliver Goldsmith
1990
 Julius Caesar
 Much Ado About Nothing
 The Rivals by Richard Brinsley Sheridan
1991
 Antony and Cleopatra
 Othello
 The Taming of the Shrew
1992
 Macbeth
 As You Like It
 The Winter's Tale
1993
 Richard II
 Pericles
 A Midsummer Night's Dream
1994
 Romeo and Juliet
 The Two Gentlemen of Verona
 Henry IV, Part 1
1995
 Cymbeline
 Henry IV, Part 2
 The Comedy of Errors
1996
 Twelfth Night
 The Tempest
 The Triumph of Love by Pierre de Marivaux
1997
 Hamlet
 All's Well That Ends Well
 Rosencrantz and Guildenstern Are Dead by Tom Stoppard
1998
 Much Ado About Nothing
 Measure for Measure
 The Falcon's Pitch, an adaptation by Jeffrey Sweet of Shakespeare's Henry VI plays 
1999
 The Merry Wives of Windsor
 Richard III
 Wild Oats by John O'Keefe
2000
 The Taming of the Shrew
 King John
 The Three Musketeers adapted by Eberle Thomas and Barbara Redmond
2001
 Love's Labour's Lost
 Coriolanus
 Othello
2002
 Merchant of Venice
 A Midsummer Night's Dream
 Romeo and Juliet
2003
 As You Like It
 King Lear
 Knight of the Burning Pestle by Francis Beaumont and John Fletcher
2004
 Two Gentlemen of Verona
 Cyrano de Bergerac by Edmond Rostand
 Hamlet
2005
 Macbeth
 Twelfth Night
 Henry VIII
2006
 Julius Caesar
 Pericles
 The Comedy of Errors
2007
 Much Ado About Nothing
 Henry V
 Love's Labour's Lost
2008
 The Taming of the Shrew
 Titus Andronicus
 The Complete Works of William Shakespeare Abridged by Adam Long, Daniel Singer and Jess Winfield
 A Midsummer Night's Dream (Shakespeare Alive!)
2009
 A Midsummer Night's Dream
 Richard III
 Scapin adapted by Bill Irwin and Mark O’Donnell
 The Tempest (Shakespeare Alive!)
2010
 The Tempest
 The Three Musketeers adapted by Robert Kauzlaric
 The Merry Wives of Windsor
 As You Like It (Shakespeare Alive!)
2011
 The Complete Works of William Shakespeare (Abridged) by Adam Long, Daniel Singer and Jess Winfield
 The Winter's Tale
 Romeo and Juliet
 Twelfth Night (TYA)
2012
 As You Like It
 Othello
 The Rivals by Richard Brinsley Sheridan
 The Comedy of Errors (TYA)
2013
 The Comedy of Errors
 Macbeth
 Failure: A Love Story by Philip Dawkins
 The Magical Mind of Billy Shakespeare (TYA) by Kevin Rich
2014
 Much Ado About Nothing
 Antony and Cleopatra
 Elizabeth Rex by Timothy Findley
2015
 Love's Labour's Lost
 Q Gents — an adaptation of The Two Gentlemen of Verona by The Q Brothers
 Richard II
 Love's Labor's Won by Scott Kaiser
2016
 Hamlet
 Twelfth Night
 Peter and the Starcatcher
2017
 A Midsummer Night's Dream
 Shakespeare’s Amazing Cymbeline -- adapted by Chris Coleman
 I Heart Juliet - an adaptation of Romeo and Juliet by The Q Brothers
2018
 The Merry Wives of Windsor Henry V Shakespeare in Love - adapted for the stage by Lee Hall and based on the screenplay by Marc Norman and Tom Stoppard
2019
 As You Like It - adapted by Robert Quinlan and Jordan Coughtry
 Pride and Prejudice by Jane Austen - adapted by Deanna Jent
 Caesar - adapted from Julius Caesar (play) by Quetta Carpenter
2020
Festival canceled due to the pandemic
2021
 Measure for Measure The Winter's Tale2022
 Much Ado About Nothing The Complete Works of William Shakespeare (Abridged) by Adam Long, Daniel Singer and Jess Winfield
 King Lear''

References

External links
 Illinois Shakespeare Festival homepage

Bloomington, Illinois
Shakespeare festivals in the United States
Shakespearean theatre companies
Festivals in Illinois
Tourist attractions in Bloomington–Normal